Atlas Township is located in Pike County, Illinois. As of the 2010 census, its population was 563 and it contained 321 housing units.

Geography

Demographics

According to the census of 2017, the population is 417.

References

External links
 US Census
 City-data.com
 Illinois State Archives

Townships in Pike County, Illinois
Townships in Illinois